Greatest Hits is a compilation album by the British rock band Queen, released worldwide on 26 October 1981. The album consisted of Queen's biggest hits since their first chart appearance in 1974 with "Seven Seas of Rhye", up to their 1980 hit "Flash" (though in some countries "Under Pressure", the band's 1981 chart-topper with David Bowie, was included). There was no universal track listing or cover art for the album, and each territory's tracks were dependent on what singles had been released there and which were successful. In 1992, the US version of the album Classic Queen was released following the band's rekindled popularity in the nation.

Greatest Hits is the band's best-selling album to date, with total sales of over 25 million copies, making it one of the best-selling albums of all time. It reached number one on the UK Albums Chart, spending four weeks at the top and sold consistently well throughout the 1980s, becoming the fourth-biggest selling album of the decade. The single "Under Pressure", which was released the same week as Greatest Hits, also topped the UK Singles Chart.

As of July 2022, Greatest Hits has spent over 1000 weeks on the UK Albums Chart, and has been certified 23× platinum with sales of over seven million copies, making it the best-selling album of all time in the UK. Greatest Hits peaked at number eight on the Billboard 200 in November 2020, the second-slowest ascent to the top ten of the US album chart in history. Among the longest charting albums in the US, as of March 2023, it has spent 533 weeks on the Billboard 200, and has been certified 9× platinum in the US. It has also been certified 15× platinum in Australia, 10× platinum in New Zealand, and 3× platinum in Canada. Following the release of the Queen biopic Bohemian Rhapsody in 2018, it re-entered the charts worldwide.

Release 
There was no universal track listing or cover art for the Greatest Hits album, and each territory's tracks were dependent on what singles were released there and what tracks charted. In some territories, despite the band's popularity, not enough songs were issued as singles to fill a compilation album, and a few album tracks were used as filler. Some examples of these were "Sweet Lady" and "Love of My Life", neither of which was released as a single in any country but appear on some regions' 1981 Hits release. In the UK, the album was limited to the Queen singles that had reached the top 20 in the UK singles chart up to that point, plus "We Will Rock You", which had been the B-side of "We Are the Champions".

The US ended up with its original edit of Queen's first single release, "Keep Yourself Alive", originally released in 1973 and re-released in the US in 1975, following the success of "Bohemian Rhapsody". The US version also added "Under Pressure", Queen's collaboration with David Bowie, which was released the same week as Greatest Hits and subsequently topped the UK Singles Chart and reached the top ten in many charts around the world. However, the song was not included on the European versions of Greatest Hits – according to Queen's business manager Jim Beach, this was because the longer manufacturing time required to press records in Europe meant that several hundred thousand copies of the album had already been pressed up before the song had been recorded.

In Argentina and Brazil, the LP edition included the same track listing as the UK Greatest Hits, minus "Seven Seas of Rhye" and including "Love of My Life" (Live Killers version). The CD version is the same as the British version.

The cover photo that appeared on the UK and US release was taken by Lord Snowdon at his home studio, using only natural light. For the 1981 release, the photo was skewed, but was later presented as it was originally taken for the 2011 re-release.

In 1991, Queen sought to issue a second Greatest Hits collection worldwide, this time with a standard track listing. However, the band had just changed record labels in the US, from Capitol to Hollywood Records, who were keen on a massive promotion of the band's back catalogue. The problem was that Elektra still held the US rights to that first 1981 collection (despite being Hollywood's US licensee). Hollywood Records decided not to release Greatest Hits II to the US market, but instead created their own collection, Classic Queen (1992), peaking at number four on the Billboard 200 chart. This compilation was made up of tracks such as "Bohemian Rhapsody", "Keep Yourself Alive" and "Under Pressure" (which had already appeared on the Elektra 1981 Hits collection), as well as newer tracks ("A Kind of Magic" and "Radio Ga Ga"). Some tracks were not even singles in the US ("One Year of Love") or anywhere ("Stone Cold Crazy"). Though well received, this collection would eventually pose the problem of overlapping track lists in the future.

Later that year, Hollywood Records released a companion collection, Greatest Hits, with similar artwork (on a red background, where Classic Queen was on royal blue). Commonly referred to as the Red Greatest Hits, it features most of the '70s tracks absent from Classic Queen (including "Another One Bites the Dust", "We Will Rock You", "We Are the Champions" and "Killer Queen"). 

In 2004, to promote the Las Vegas production of the musical We Will Rock You, Hollywood Records released Greatest Hits: We Will Rock You Edition, which was the UK Greatest Hits with three bonus tracks.

Greatest Flix and Greatest Pix 
Greatest Hits was released alongside Greatest Flix, a 60-minute compilation released on VHS video, LaserDisc, and CED Videodisc of all the videos Queen had made up until that point in chronological order, and Greatest Pix, a 96-page paperback book edited by Jacques Lowe which featured photos of the band taken by Neal Preston. Although Greatest Flix only listed 17 videos on its sleeve, it contained two videos for "We Will Rock You". The video for "Killer Queen" had been shot especially for Greatest Flix, as no video had been made for the song on its original release in 1974. In the US, the release of Greatest Flix was scheduled for 15 November 1981 on Warner Home Video, but distribution was switched to EMI Music after the band's management disagreed with Warner's recent decision to move to a rental-only programme instead of selling their videos.  In 1992, Holywood Records released a VHS version to accompany the album, simply called Greatest Hits.

Greatest Flix (1981)
"Killer Queen"
"Bohemian Rhapsody"
"You're My Best Friend"
"Somebody to Love"
"Tie Your Mother Down"
"We Are the Champions"
"We Will Rock You"
"We Will Rock You (Live)"
"Spread Your Wings"
"Bicycle Race"
"Fat Bottomed Girls"
"Don't Stop Me Now"
"Love of My Life (Live)"
"Crazy Little Thing Called Love"
"Save Me"
"Play the Game"
"Another One Bites the Dust"
"Flash"

Note: On the sleeve notes of the video, "We Are the Champions" is incorrectly listed after the two versions of "We Will Rock You".

Greatest Hits (1992 US edition)
"We Will Rock You"
"We Are the Champions"
"Another One Bites the Dust"
"Killer Queen"
"Somebody to Love"
"Fat Bottomed Girls"
"Bicycle Race"
"You're My Best Friend"
"Crazy Little Thing Called Love"
"Now I'm Here"
"Play the Game"
"Seven Seas of Rhye"
"Body Language"
"Save Me"
"Don't Stop Me Now"
"Good Old-Fashioned Lover Boy"
"I Want to Break Free"
"Bohemian Rhapsody (Original Version)"
"We Will Rock You (Rick Rubin 'Ruined' Remix Edit)" (end credits)

Note: New videos were created for Now I'm Here, Seven Seas Of Rhye and Good Old-Fashioned Lover Boy for this collection, as they did not previously have music videos.

Critical reception and legacy 

Initial reviews of the album in the British music press were negative. In NME Barney Hoskyns said, "All of [their songs], besides 'Another One Bites the Dust', are quite repulsive, unbelievably crass insults to their respective genres and uniformly vulgar music. It was only when Queen took vulgarity to its absolute limit that they stood out." Melody Makers Adam Sweeting stated, "I've never been the slightest bit interested in Queen's ridiculous pomposity and Freddie just makes me snigger, but I suppose songs like 'Killer Queen' are sort of catchy, while anything as preposterous as 'We Will Rock You' deserves an award if only for bad taste".

However, retrospective reviews have rated the album higher: Ira Robbins gave Greatest Hits a B+ rating in Entertainment Weekly upon its reissue in 1992, and AllMusic awarded the record four and a half stars out of five. In an interview in 2003 as part of the Arte television programme Music Planet 2Nite, Radiohead guitarist Ed O'Brien hailed the album as "impeccable" and "absolutely genius".

Commercial performance 

In the UK, Greatest Hits debuted at number two on the UK Albums Chart and climbed to number one the following week, spending four weeks at the top. The album continued to sell well throughout the 1980s, appearing on several UK year-end charts, and by the end of the decade it had become the fourth-biggest selling album in the UK during the 1980s, with sales of over 1.9 million copies. By 2006, Greatest Hits had become the best-selling album in the UK and the first album to sell more than five million copies there. In February 2014, Greatest Hits became the first album in the UK to sell over six million copies, and it was claimed that one in three families in the UK owned a copy. In June 2022, Greatest Hits spent its 1000th week on the UK Albums Chart, and in July 2022, it reached seven million sales, with one in four households in the UK estimated to have a copy of the album.

In the US, Greatest Hits sold moderately well on initial release in 1981, obtaining a platinum certification. It reached a new peak of number 11 on the Billboard 200 chart on its reissue in 1992, and finally made the top ten of the Billboard 200 in November 2020 when it peaked at number eight, as a result of a Walmart sale on various vinyl albums on 14 November 2020. The 39 years and one month that the album took to reach the top ten of the Billboard 200 is the second-longest ascent to the top ten in the history of the US album chart. One of the longest charting albums in the US, as of March 2023 it has spent 533 weeks on the Billboard 200. Greatest Hits has now been certified nine times platinum in the US for sales of nine million copies, making it the band's best-selling album in that country. It is also the band's best-selling album to date, with total sales of over 25 million copies.

Track listing 
This section includes the track listings for the original Greatest Hits in its various forms. For other compilations, including the second and third Greatest Hits albums, see the relevant articles.

On the 17-track UK editions, Freddie Mercury was the writer of ten of the songs, Brian May five and John Deacon two. Roger Taylor had not written any songs that had been released as singles for the band at that point.

In addition to the variations above, the official biography Queen: As It Began by Jacky Gunn and Jim Jenkins states the following variations on the original UK track listing:

Argentina, Brazil, Mexico and Venezuela had "Love of My Life" (live version) instead of "Seven Seas of Rhye".
Belgium and Spain had "Spread Your Wings" as an extra track.
Australia was identical to the US version, but had "Tie Your Mother Down" (live version, with organ intro) as an extra track.
Bulgaria had "Death On Two Legs" and "Sweet Lady" as extra tracks.
Canada, France, Germany, Israel and Netherlands had "Under Pressure" as an extra track.
Germany also added "Spread Your Wings" on some first pressing copies.

Personnel
Queen
 Freddie Mercury – lead, backing and operatic vocals, acoustic piano, jangle piano, fingersnaps, bicycle bells, handclaps, acoustic guitar, organ, synthesizer, footstomps, fingersnaps (on original North American release only), drum machine (on 1991 North American release only), synth bass
 Brian May – acoustic and electric guitars, co-lead vocals on "Fat Bottomed Girls" (chorus), backing and operatic vocals, bicycle bells, handclaps, piano, synthesizer, footstomps, fingersnaps (on original North American release only), co-lead vocals on "Keep Yourself Alive" (bridge), harmonium (on Japanese release only)
 Roger Taylor – acoustic and (on 1991 North American release only) electronic drums, percussion, backing and operatic vocals, timpani, gong, triangle, chimes, bicycle bells, handclaps, woodblocks, tambourine, footstomps, fingersnaps (on original North American release only), cowbell, co-lead vocals on "Keep Yourself Alive" (bridge), rhythm guitar (on 2004 US edition), lead vocals (on 2004 US edition)
 John Deacon – bass guitar, electric guitar, acoustic and electric pianos, bicycle bells, handclaps, footstomps, fingersnaps (on original North American release only), synthesizer (on 1991 North American release only)

Additional personnel (original UK release)
 Mike Stone – co-lead vocals on "Good Old-Fashioned Lover Boy"
 Roy Thomas Baker – stylophone on "Seven Seas of Rhye"

Additional personnel (original North American release)
 David Bowie – co-lead vocals on "Under Pressure"

Additional personnel (1991 North American release)
 Fred Mandel – synthesizer on "I Want to Break Free"

Charts

Weekly charts

Year-end charts

Decade-end charts

Certifications and sales

Release history

See also 
List of best-selling albums
List of best-selling albums in Australia
List of best-selling albums in Austria
List of best-selling albums in Germany
List of best-selling albums in the United Kingdom

References

External links 
 Queen official website: Discography: Greatest Hits: includes lyrics of "Flash".
 Lyrics of Greatest Hits I [1980]

Queen (band) compilation albums
1981 greatest hits albums
1992 greatest hits albums
Elektra Records compilation albums
Hollywood Records compilation albums
Parlophone compilation albums